Lagocephalus is a genus of fish in the family Tetraodontidae (pufferfish) with a circumglobal distribution.

Species
There are currently 8 recognized species in this genus:

 Lagocephalus guentheri A. Miranda-Ribeiro, 1915 (Diamond-back puffer)
 Lagocephalus inermis (Temminck & Schlegel, 1850)
 Lagocephalus laevigatus (Linnaeus, 1766) (Smooth puffer)
 Lagocephalus lagocephalus (Linnaeus, 1758) (Oceanic puffer)
 Lagocephalus lunaris (Bloch & J. G. Schneider, 1801) (Lunartail puffer)
 Lagocephalus sceleratus (J. F. Gmelin, 1789) (Silver-cheeked puffer)
 Lagocephalus spadiceus (J. Richardson, 1845) (Half-smooth golden puffer)
 Lagocephalus suezensis E. Clark & Gohar, 1953

References

 
Marine fish genera
Taxa named by William John Swainson
Tetraodontidae